The Tower of Capu Neru is a Genoese tower located in the commune of Coti-Chiavari (Corse-du-Sud) on the west coast of the Corsica.

Construction of the tower began 1597. It was one of a series of coastal defences built by the Republic of Genoa between 1530 and 1620 to stem the attacks by Barbary pirates. In 1994 the tower was listed as one of the official historical monuments of France.

See also
List of Genoese towers in Corsica

Notes and references

External links
 Includes information on how to reach 90 towers and many photographs.

Towers in Corsica
Monuments historiques of Corsica